FC Gornyak Uchaly is a Russian football club from Uchaly.

History
In 2006, playing at the regional level, the team was the second in the Bashkortostan championship and won the Bashkortostan cup. In 2007 the team won Ural and West Siberia zonal tournament of the Russian Amateur Football League. In 2008–2013 (five seasons) they played in the Russian Second Division, Ural-Povolzhye zone (third level in the Russian league system).

The team's best league result is the 2nd place in "Ural-Povolzhye" in 2009; in 2010 they surprisingly defeated FC Lokomotiv Moscow (1–0) in the cup game (and then lost to FC Alania Vladikavkaz in penalty shootout only). The club withdrew from Second Division in 2013.

References

External links
Official Website

 
Association football clubs established in 2007
Defunct football clubs in Russia
Sport in Bashkortostan
2007 establishments in Russia